Robert Hampden-Trevor, 1st Viscount Hampden (17 February 1706 – 22 August 1783) was a British diplomat at The Hague and then joint Postmaster General.

Origins
He was the eldest son of the second marriage of his father Thomas Trevor, 1st Baron Trevor to Anne Bernard, née Weldon.

Career
He studied at The Queen's College, Oxford, graduated in 1725 and then became a fellow of All Souls College, Oxford. In 1729 he was appointed as a clerk in the Secretary of State's office. In 1734 he went to the United Provinces as secretary to the embassy under Horatio Walpole. He succeeded as head of the embassy in 1739, initially as Envoy-Extraordinary, and from 1741 as Minister-Plenipotentiary. During this time he maintained a regular correspondence with Horace Walpole.

IN 1750 he was appointed a Commissioner of the Revenue in Ireland.  He took the additional surname of Hampden in 1754, on succeeding to the estates of his relative John Hampden. Twelve years after he had succeeded his brother as Baron Trevor, he was created, on 14 June 1776, Viscount Hampden, of Great and Little Hampden in the County of Buckingham.

From 1759 to 1765 he was joint Postmaster General. He wrote some Latin poems which were published at Parma in 1792 as Poemata Hampdeniana. His second son, John Hampden-Trevor, 3rd Viscount Hampden (1749–1824), died only three weeks after he had succeeded his elder brother Thomas Hampden-Trevor, 2nd Viscount Hampden, when the titles became extinct.

References

William Carr, "Trevor, Robert Hampden-, first Viscount Hampden (1706–1783)", rev. Martyn J. Powell, Oxford Dictionary of National Biography, (Oxford University Press, 2004; online edn, Jan 2008) , accessed 10 Aug 2008.

1706 births
1783 deaths
1
Alumni of The Queen's College, Oxford
Diplomatic peers
Fellows of All Souls College, Oxford
United Kingdom Postmasters General
Ambassadors of Great Britain to the Netherlands